The Silas Owens Sr. House is a historic house at 157 Solomon Grove Road in Twin Groves, Arkansas.  It is a single-story masonry structure, built out of fieldstone with cream-colored brick and concrete trim elements.  It has a gable roof with exposed rafter ends, and its front has an arcade of three segmented-arch openings.  The house was built about 1948 by Silas Owens, Sr., a prominent regional master mason, as his family home.  While the work is typical of his high quality, its use of cream-colored brick (one of his hallmarks) is unusually restrained.

The house was listed on the National Register of Historic Places in 2005.

See also
National Register of Historic Places listings in Faulkner County, Arkansas

References

Houses on the National Register of Historic Places in Arkansas
Houses completed in 1948
Houses in Faulkner County, Arkansas